Penicillium coffeae is a fungus species of the genus of Penicillium which was isolated from the plant Coffea arabica L. in Hawaii. Insects play a role in spreading Penicillium coffeae.

See also
 List of Penicillium species

References

Further reading
 
 

coffeae
Fungi described in 2005